Hadan station is a railway station in Chŏngju, North P'yŏngan Province, North Korea. It is on located on the P'yŏngŭi Line of the Korean State Railway.

History
The station was originally opened on 16 July 1938 by the Chosen Government Railway.

References

Railway stations in North Korea
Buildings and structures in North Pyongan Province
Railway stations opened in 1938
1938 establishments in Korea